Golf Club Halt railway station, was a railway station in Hove, in East Sussex, England which opened in 1891 and closed in 1939.  The station served the Brighton & Hove Golf Club, established in 1887. 
, the platform is still in situ, buried in undergrowth on private farmland.

References 

Disused railway stations in Brighton and Hove
Former London, Brighton and South Coast Railway stations
Railway stations in Great Britain opened in 1891
Railway stations in Great Britain closed in 1917
Railway stations in Great Britain opened in 1920
Railway stations in Great Britain closed in 1939
Hove